Bear Branch Nature Center is a nature center in Carroll County, Maryland near Westminster. It features interpretive exhibits about local plants and animals, an outdoor water feature and play area, a Discovery Room for children, an observation beehive, live animals including an eagle, hawks, owls, snakes, salamanders, turtles, frogs, and toads, a planetarium and observatory.  The center is a facility of Carroll County Recreation & Parks.

The nature center is adjacent to Hashawha Environmental Center, a residential facility that is also operated by Carroll County Recreation & Parks.  Hashawha Environmental Center is home to Carroll County Public Schools' Outdoor School, a residential environmental education program open to every sixth grade student in the county.

The two facilities are located on approximately 320 acres, with more than five miles of multi-use trails, a restored 19th century cabin, a lake, a pond, and access to both Bear Branch and Big Pipe Creek.

History
In 1972, the county purchased the land on which Bear Branch Nature Center and Hashawha Environmental Center are built. The name "Hashawha" is a Native American word meaning "old fields."

Hashawha Tower
The Hashawha Tower is a 10 m (35 ft) tall windmill donated to Hashawha Westminster, Maryland, located at Hashawha Environmental Center.

Gallery

References

External links
Hashawha/Bear Branch - Carroll County Recreation & Parks

1993 establishments in Maryland
Museums in Carroll County, Maryland
Nature centers in Maryland
Protected areas of Carroll County, Maryland
Westminster, Maryland